Hristo Donchev Petkov (born 17 October 1928) was a Bulgarian cross-country skier who competed in the 1950s. He finished 25th in the 50 km event at the 1952 Winter Olympics in Oslo. He also competed in two events at the 1956 Winter Olympics.

References

External links
Olympic 50 km cross country skiing results: 1948-64

1928 births
Possibly living people
Bulgarian male cross-country skiers
Olympic cross-country skiers of Bulgaria
Cross-country skiers at the 1952 Winter Olympics
Cross-country skiers at the 1956 Winter Olympics